2011–12 Belarusian Cup was the twenty first season of the Belarusian annual cup competition. Contrary to the league season, it is conducted in a fall-spring rhythm. The first games were played on 14 June 2011. Winners of the Cup qualified for the second qualifying round of the 2012–13 UEFA Europa League.

Participating clubs 
The following teams took part in the competition:

First round
32 teams started the competition in this round: 12 teams from the First League, 15 teams from Second League (all but Dinamo-2 Minsk) and 5 amateur clubs. 4 First League clubs that were at the top of league table at the moment of the draw (Slavia Mozyr, SKVICH Minsk, Partizan Minsk and Vedrich-97 Rechitsa) and all 12 Premier League teams received a bye to the next round. Matches of this round were played on 14, 15 and 16 June 2011.

Round of 32
The winners from the First Round will play against 16 clubs that received a bye to this round. The draw was conducted on 17 June 2011. Matches of this round were played on 29 June 2011. Due to scheduling conflicts with qualifying rounds of UEFA Champions League and Europa League, games involving BATE Borisov, Minsk and Shakhtyor Soligorsk were rescheduled to 22 July, 17 August and 6 September 2011 respectively.

Round of 16
The draw was conducted on 28 July 2011. The games were played on 21 September and 13 November 2011.

Quarterfinals
An open draw for quarterfinals was conducted on 21 November 2011.

Match between Lida and Naftan was moved from Lida to Grodno due to bad pitch conditions in March. Match between Klechesk and Neman was moved from Kletsk to the opponent's stadium in Grodno for similar reasons.

Semifinals

The draw for semifinals was held on March 19 and was an open draw.

Final

See also
 2011 Belarusian Premier League
 2012 Belarusian Premier League
 2011 Belarusian First League

References

External links
 Football.by

2011–12 domestic association football cups
Cup
Cup
2011-12